LPX can mean:

 Landing Platform eXperimental, a classification of warship characterized by the South Korean LPX Dokdo
 Liepāja International Airport
 LPX (form factor), motherboard standard
 Lean Packet Exchange protocol, an ethernet protocol used to communicate with the variant Network Direct Attached Storage (NDAS) of NetDisk.
 LPX, a musician solo project by Lizzy Plapinger